The Popular Front for the Liberation of Oman (in , PFLO) was a Marxist and Arab nationalist revolutionary organisation in the Sultanate of Oman. It fought against the Sultan (ruler) in the Dhofar Rebellion from the PFLO's foundation until the suppression of the insurgency in 1976.

Background 
The main forerunner of the PFLO was the Dhofar Liberation Front (جبهة تحرير ظفار - Jabhat Tahrir Dhofar, DLF) which was based in Dhofar, the southern province of Oman. It was founded in 1962 by the Dhofar Benevolent Society (DBS), the Dhofar Soldiers’ Organisation (DSO) and the local branch of the Arab Nationalist Movement (ANM) and began armed struggle in June 1965.

Formation of the Popular Front
In September 1968 the DLF was renamed the Popular Front for the Liberation of the Occupied Arabian Gulf (al-Jabha al-Sha'abiya li-Tahrir al-Khalij al-'Arabi al-Muhtall, PFLOAG). Its members were inclined towards the leftist, Marxist-Leninist tendency in the ANM, and were also influenced by the revolutionary experience of neighbouring South Yemen.

In June 1970 the National Democratic Front for the Liberation of Oman and the Arabian Gulf (al-Jabha al-Wataniya al-Dimuqratiya li-Tahrir 'Uman wa-l-Khalij al-'Arabi, NDFLOAG) was founded in the north of Oman. It merged with the PFLOAG in December 1971. The new organisation was called Popular Front for the Liberation of Oman and the Arabian Gulf (al-Jabhah al-Sha'abiyah li-Tahrir 'Uman wa-al-Khalij al-'Arabi, PFLOAG). By 1973 reports surged that PFLOAG had formed clandestine cells within the UAE armed forces.

The group took its later name, PFLO, in 1974 when the Popular Front for the Liberation of Bahrain (PFLB) was established as a separate organisation. The PFLO appears to have maintained some underground activity afterwards. The youth wing of PFLO was the Oman Youth Organization, and it published the 'Uman al-Thawrah

The Dhofar Rebellion

Upon its establishment, the PFLOAG became involved in the ongoing Dhofar rebellion against Sultan Sa'id. It suffered a split in 1970 when some of its more right-wing members decided to accept the offer of an amnesty from the newly enthroned Sultan Qaboos. The new ruler was successful in pacifying most of Dhofar, with the help of considerable military and financial aid from the Western bloc, and by 1976 the rebellion was at an end.

The PFLO After 1976 
In 1992, the party was renamed to People's Democratic Front of Oman (al-Jabhah al-Sha'abiyah al-Dimuqratiyah al-'Umaniyah, PDFO) which struggles peacefully for democracy. Its secretary general in 1992 was Abdul Aziz al-Qadi.

Sources
Omania.net discussion board (in Arabic)
Nadyelfikr.net discussion board (in Arabic)
Dhofar Rebellion in Oman 1964–1975, OnWar.com, December 16, 2000

References

1974 establishments in Oman
1992 disestablishments in Oman
Arab nationalism in Oman
Arab nationalist militant groups
Arab Nationalist Movement
Arab socialist organizations
Communist parties in Oman
Dhofar Rebellion
Defunct organizations based in Oman
National liberation movements
Political parties disestablished in 1992
Political parties established in 1974
Popular fronts
Paramilitary organizations based in Oman